The England national cricket team toured Pakistan from November 1977 to January 1978 and played a three-match Test series against the Pakistan national cricket team. The Test series was drawn 0–0. England were captained by Mike Brearley and Pakistan by Wasim Bari. Geoffrey Boycott captained England in the third test after Brearley returned home with a broken arm. In addition, the teams played a three-match Limited Overs International (LOI) series which England won 2–1.

Test series summary

First Test

Second Test

Third Test

One Day Internationals (ODIs)

1st ODI

2nd ODI

3rd ODI

References

External links

1977 in English cricket
1977 in Pakistani cricket
1978 in English cricket
1978 in Pakistani cricket
1977-78
International cricket competitions from 1975–76 to 1980
Pakistani cricket seasons from 1970–71 to 1999–2000